Hong Song-nam (2 October 1929 – 31 March 2009) was a North Korean politician who was the Premier of North Korea from 1998 to 2003. He succeeded Kang Song-san. Born in Kangwon Province, he graduated from the Kim Il-sung University and studied electrical engineering at the Prague Technical Institute.

From 1954 he worked in the North Korean Ministry of Heavy Industry. In 1971–1973 he was Minister of Heavy Industry. From 1973–1975 he was Deputy Chairman of the Administrative Council of the DPRK. In 1973–1977 he was Chairman of the State Planning Commission. From 1982 to 1986 he was First Secretary of the Workers' Party of Korea of South Pyongan Province. In 1987–1990 he served as Deputy Chairman of the Administrative Council, the chairman of the State Planning Commission of the DPRK. From 1990–1998 he was deputy chairman of the Administrative Council (deputy premier).

Hong died on 31 March 2009. A funeral committee chaired by Kim Yong-nam was appointed with Jo Myong-rok, Kim Yong-chun, and 33 others as its members.

Works

See also 
 Politics of North Korea

References 

 

1929 births
2009 deaths
Prime Ministers of North Korea
Workers' Party of Korea politicians